The RAMLink was one of several RAM expansion products made by Creative Micro Designs (CMD) for Commodore's C64/128 home computers. The RAMLink was intended as a third-party alternative, successor and optionally companion to Commodore's own 17xx-series REU RAM expansion cartridges.

Unlike the REU, the RAMLink is externally powered and designed from the ground-up to act as a RAM disk.

Features
 Allows up to 16 MB of expansion RAM. The expansion memory can be provided by a combination of 30-pin SIMM RAM on an internal card, a Commodore 17xx-series REU (or a clone) plugged into the RAM Port, or a GeoRAM.
 Provides its own copy of JiffyDOS, allowing accelerated operation with any other JiffyDOS-equipped disk device, as well as shorthand commands (DOS Wedge) to conveniently access any other connected storage devices.
 Full set of partitioning tools and DOS commands.
 Commodore 1541, 1571 and 1581 disk-layout emulation modes
 One partition type provides Direct-access REU-like capability
 Secondary power socket and on-board charging circuit to accept a 6-volt "sealed" lead acid backup battery.
 Battery-backed real time clock for time and date stamping of files, if the internal RAM card is present.
 Includes drivers to allow GEOS to use its memory as either a replacement for swap space, or as a regular 'disk' drive.
 Custom parallel connection for the CMD HD Series line of hard drives.
 Pass-through expansion port for standard cartridges (e.g. Action Replay, Super Snapshot)
 On-device buttons to swap device numbers with other drives, switches to disable 17xx-series REUs or change their handling.

References 
 Creative Micro Designs (1990). CMD RAMLink User's Manual, third edition. (supplied with the hardware)

External links
Technical info, Games & Utilities

Home computer peripherals
Memory expansion
CMD RAMLink